Glomeris connexa is a species of pill millipedes.

These pill millipedes are shiny black/gray or brownish.

This species is present in Silesia, Bavaria, Savoy and from the Southern Alps to the Apennines.

References

 SysMyr: Systematic Myriapod Database. Spelda J.,

External links

Glomerida
Millipedes of Europe